Tri-City Jewish Cemetery, also known as the B'nai Ameth Cemetery, is located above Rockingham Road in the West End of Davenport, Iowa. It is located on a very steep hill. The place has had some problems with littering likely caused by younger citizens with beer cans being left at the landmark.

References

External links
 
 

Geography of Davenport, Iowa
Cemeteries in Iowa
Jewish cemeteries in the United States
Protected areas of Scott County, Iowa